City Point is a mixed-use multi-building residential and commercial complex in Downtown Brooklyn, New York City. City Point is, by square footage, the largest mixed-use development in the city. City Point III is currently the second tallest building in Brooklyn as well as the second tallest in Long Island.

City Point was supported by the New York City Economic Development Corporation as a sustainable mixed-use development for retail and housing. The project was developed by Albee Development LLC and designed by Cook + Fox architects, and aims to be LEED-silver certified. It was expected to create at least 328 construction jobs and 108 permanent jobs.

The complex is built over the northwest entrance to the DeKalb Avenue station on the New York City Subway's . It is across the Flatbush Avenue Extension from Long Island University's Brooklyn campus, and across Fleet Street from the future site of 9 DeKalb Avenue. City Point is located on the former site of the Albee Square Mall, and its southern entrance is centered on the Fulton Street Mall near the historic Dime Savings Bank of New York.

Description and history

In 2004, New York City's office of Economic Development adopted the "Downtown Brooklyn Plan", which consisted of a series of zoning changes and public works. City Point was one of the winning developments proposed, sitting on municipal-owned land, in an area already well-established as a shopping corridor.

The development was stalled in permitting but was helped through by then-Brooklyn Borough President Marty Markowitz, when the developers, Acadia Realty, made donations to a non-profit Markowitz operated. Markowitz and Acadia denied wrongdoing and cast the blame on the insistence of a partner firm, PA Associates, who were later indicted with bribing former New York State Senator Carl Kruger.

Towers
The first tower, City Point Tower I (also known as 7 DeKalb), opened in 2015.

The second tower, City Point Tower II (also known as 1 DeKalb Avenue), or 10 City Point, doing business as City Tower was completed in 2015 and opened in 2016. It is a 30-story, 335,000-square-foot tower with 440 market-rate units.

It is planned to contain 458 market-rate condo units taking up , with three stories of commercial space occupying . Tower III will be doing business as Brooklyn Point and is being designed by the firm Kohn Pedersen Fox. This would be the only for-sale residential development at City Point.

Shopping
Accessible by entrances on Flatbush Avenue Extension and on Fulton Street is a shopping plaza with big box national chain stores, smaller retail shops, a movie theater, bar, and grocery store, as well as restaurants and a 27,000 square foot food court in the basement of Tower II called DeKalb Market Hall. DeKalb Market Hall has 40 different vendors, small businesses based in the New York City area.

Between the first and second towers is "the podium", within which was built  of retail space, including Primark and an Alamo Drafthouse. On January 29, 2017, Target opened its store in City Point Tower II. In September 2020, Century 21 filed for Chapter 11 bankruptcy and announced that they will close all of their nine locations, including at City Point. Primark replaced Century 21, with a 4-floor store opening December 20, 2022.

Statue of Ruth Bader Ginsburg 
The statue of Ruth Bader Ginsburg was installed permanently outside 445 Albee Square in City Point on March 12, 2021. The statue consists of a  bronze statue, set on a  base, depicting Ruth Bader Ginsburg, the second woman to serve on the United States Supreme Court.

Notable tenants
Alamo Drafthouse
Primark
Flying Tiger Copenhagen
Katz's Delicatessen
Target
Trader Joe's

See also
List of tallest buildings in Brooklyn

References

External links 
 City Point official website
 DeKalb Market Hall official website
 Tower I, "7 DeKalb" official website
 Tower II, "City Tower" official website
 Tower III, "Brooklyn Point" official website

Residential buildings in Brooklyn
Housing in New York City
Multi-building developments in New York City
Buildings and structures in Brooklyn
Downtown Brooklyn
Shopping malls in New York City
Skyscrapers in Brooklyn
2015 establishments in New York City
Theatres in Brooklyn
Entertainment venues in Brooklyn